

The Engineering Division XCO-2 was an observation aircraft designed at the United States Army Air Corps Engineering Division.

Development
The XCO-2 was a conventional biplane with four machine guns and a Liberty 12 engine, as well as a fabric covering. The prototype flew in 1922 but crashing during flight tests.

Operators

United States Army Air Corps

Specifications

See also

References

Further reading

CO-2
Single-engined tractor aircraft
Biplanes
1920s United States military reconnaissance aircraft